Belpre Township may refer to the following townships in the United States:

 Belpre Township, Edwards County, Kansas
 Belpre Township, Washington County, Ohio